The Negro American League was one of the several Negro leagues created during the time organized American baseball was segregated. The league was established in 1937, and disbanded after its 1962 season.

Negro American League franchises 
''Annual final standings: 1937, 1938, 1939, 1940, 1941, 1942, 1943, 1944, 1945, 1946, 1947, 1948

 Birmingham Black Barons (1937–1938; 1940–1962)
 Chicago American Giants (1937–1952)
 Cincinnati Tigers (1937)
 Detroit Stars (III) (1937)
 Indianapolis Athletics (1937)
 Kansas City Monarchs (1937–1962)
 Memphis Red Sox (1937–1959)
 St. Louis Stars (II) (1937)
 Atlanta Black Crackers (1938) / Indianapolis ABCs (IV) (1939)
 Jacksonville Red Caps (1938; 1941–1942) / Cleveland Bears (1939–1940)
 Indianapolis ABCs (III) (1938) / St. Louis Stars (III) (1939) / St. Louis–New Orleans Stars (1940–1941)
 Toledo Crawfords (1939) / Indianapolis Crawfords (1940)
 Cincinnati-Cleveland Buckeyes (1942) / Cleveland Buckeyes (1943–1948; 1950) / Louisville Buckeyes (1949)
 Cincinnati Clowns (1943) / Cincinnati–Indianapolis Clowns (1944–1945) / Indianapolis Clowns (1946–1954)
 Baltimore Elite Giants (1949–1951) from the Negro National League
 Houston Eagles (formerly Newark Eagles) (1949–1950) / New Orleans Eagles (1951) from the Negro National League
 New York Cubans (1949–1950)  from the Negro National League
 Philadelphia Stars (1949–1952) from the Negro National League
 Detroit Stars (1954–1957; 1959) / Detroit Clowns (1958) / Detroit–New Orleans Stars (1960)
 Louisville Clippers (1954)
 Raleigh Tigers (1959–1962)
 New Orleans Crescent Stars (1957)
 Mobile Havana Cuban Giants (1957)
 Newark Indians (1959)

Member timeline 

Major league prior to 1950; minor league after 1950.

1937: Formation of NAL consisting of 8 teams — Birmingham Black Barons, Chicago American Giants, Cincinnati Tigers, Detroit Stars (III), Indianapolis Athletics, Kansas City Monarchs, Memphis Red Sox and St. Louis Stars (II).
1938: Dropped Cincinnati Tigers, Detroit Stars (III), Indianapolis Athletics and St. Louis Stars (II); Added Atlanta Black Crackers, Indianapolis ABCs (II) and Jacksonville Red Caps.
1939: Dropped Birmingham Black Barons; Added Toledo Crawfords.
1940: Dropped Indianapolis ABCs (IV); Re-added Birmingham Black Barons.
1941: Dropped Indianapolis Crawfords.
1942: Dropped St. Louis–New Orleans Stars (merged with New York Black Yankees); Added Cincinnati-Cleveland Buckeyes.
1943: Dropped Jacksonville Red Caps; Added Cincinnati Clowns.
1948: Standings and statistics were lightly reported in print starting around 1948.
1951: Indianapolis Clowns relocate to Buffalo, New York but retain the Indianapolis Clowns name.

League champions

Pennant winners 

From 1939 through 1942 and 1944 through 1947, the team in first place at the end of the season was declared the Pennant winner.  Due to the unorthodox nature of the schedule (and little incentive to enforce it), some teams frequently played many more games than others did in any given season. For example, the 1937 season featured Kansas City being first place with a 52–19–1 record (.732). However, they still competed in a Championship Series, albeit against the third place team in the Chicago American Giants (36–24–1), who played less games than the 2nd place Cincinnati Tigers (35–18–1) but had one more win.

This led to some disputed championships and two teams claiming the title.  Generally, the team with the best winning percentage (with some minimum number of games played) was awarded the Pennant, but other times it was the team with the most victories.  The "games behind" method of recording standings was uncommon in most black leagues. From 1942 until 1948, the pennant winner (as determined by record or by postseason series victory) went on to the Negro World Series.

Post-integration champions 

1949 Baltimore Elite Giants
1950 Indianapolis Clowns
1951 Indianapolis Clowns
1952 Indianapolis Clowns
1953 Kansas City Monarchs
1954 Indianapolis Clowns
1955 Birmingham Black Barons (first half); Detroit Stars (second half)†
1956 Detroit Stars
1957 Kansas City Monarchs

† – Pennant was decided via a split-season schedule with the winner of the first half of the season playing the winner of the second half of the season.

League play-offs 
On numerous occasions, the NAL split the season into two halves.  The winner of the first half played the winner of the second half for the league Pennant. As mentioned above, disputes also occurred in the split season finishes. Five times a League Championship Series was played, with varying games needed to win the Series; the 1938 series ended prematurely because of problems with finding a suitable venue for the rest of the series.

Legend
  One game finished in a tied game.

Negro World Series 

For the duration of the league, a Negro World Series took place seven times, from 1942 through 1948. The NAL Pennant winner met the champion of the rival Negro National League. Five out of the seven years, the Negro American League team (below in bold) succumbed.

1942 – Kansas City Monarchs beat Washington Homestead Grays, 4 games to 0 games
1943 – Washington Homestead Grays beat Birmingham Black Barons, 4 games to 3 games
1944 – Washington Homestead Grays beat Birmingham Black Barons, 4 games to 1 game
1945 – Cleveland Buckeyes beat Washington Homestead Grays, 4 games to 0 games
1946 – Newark Eagles beat Kansas City Monarchs, 4 games to 3 games
1947 – New York Cubans beat Cleveland Buckeyes, 4 games to 1 game
1948 – Washington Homestead Grays beat Birmingham Black Barons, 4 games to 1 game

References

Sources 

Negro baseball leagues
Defunct baseball leagues in the United States
African-American sports history
Sports leagues established in 1937
1937 establishments in the United States
Defunct professional sports leagues in the United States